Caleb Brantley (born September 2, 1994) is an American football defensive tackle who is a free agent. He played college football at Florida and was drafted by the Cleveland Browns in the sixth round of the 2017 NFL Draft. He has also been a member of the Washington Redskins / Football Team.

Early years
Brantley attended Crescent City High School in Crescent City, Florida. As a senior, he had 94 tackles and five sacks. A 4-star recruit, Brantley committed to Florida to play college football over offers from Alabama, Auburn, California, Florida A&M, Florida State, Miami, Ole Miss, Purdue, South Florida, Tennessee, and USC.

College career
After redshirting his first year at the University of Florida in 2013, Brantley played in all 12 games in 2014 and had 21 tackles. As a sophomore in 2015, he appeared in 13 games with 10 starts and recorded 28 tackles and three sacks. As a junior in 2016, he had 31 tackles and 2.5 sacks. After the season, Brantley decided to forgo his senior year and enter the 2017 NFL Draft.

Professional career

Cleveland Browns
Brantley was projected as an early second round pick. Due to pending criminal charges, he dropped to the sixth round before he was drafted 185th overall by the Cleveland Browns in the 2017 NFL Draft. The charges were dropped on May 17, 2017, with Brantley signing a four-year contract with the team a day later. Brantley was waived on September 1, 2018.

Washington Redskins / Football Team
On September 3, 2018, Brantley was signed by the Washington Redskins. He was placed on injured reserve on September 13, 2019. On March 23, 2020, Brantley re-signed with the team. He chose to opt-out of the 2020 NFL season due to the COVID-19 pandemic. Brantley was released on April 9, 2021.

References

External links
 Florida Gators bio

1994 births
Living people
American football defensive tackles
American football defensive ends
Players of American football from Florida
Florida Gators football players
People from Crescent City, Florida
Cleveland Browns players
Washington Redskins players
Washington Football Team players